Ətcələr or Etchelyar or Etcheler or Echelyar or Atcalar may refer to:
 Ətcələr, Jalilabad, Azerbaijan
 Ətcələr, Masally, Azerbaijan
 Ətcələr, Sabirabad, Azerbaijan